Passage from Hong Kong is a 1941 American comedy film directed by D. Ross Lederman and written by Fred Niblo Jr. and Earl Derr Biggers. The film stars Lucile Fairbanks, Douglas Kennedy, Paul Cavanagh, Richard Ainley, Marjorie Gateson and Gloria Holden. The film was released by Warner Bros. in September 1941.

Cast
 Lucile Fairbanks as Marcia Calhoun
 Douglas Kennedy as Jeff Hunter
 Paul Cavanagh as Capt. Duncan MacNeil-Fraser
 Richard Ainley as Lt. Norman MacNeil-Fraser
 Marjorie Gateson as Aunt Julia
 Gloria Holden as Madame Wrangell
 Lumsden Hare as Inspector Bray
 Tom Stevenson as Andrew
 Boyd Irwin as Beattie
 Chester Gan as Chung
 Joan Winfield as Steamship Clerk (uncredited)

References

External links
 

1941 films
1941 comedy films
American comedy films
American black-and-white films
1940s English-language films
Films directed by D. Ross Lederman
Films scored by William Lava
Warner Bros. films
1940s American films